The Claro Open Barranquilla (formerly Seguros Bolívar Open Barranquilla) is a tennis tournament held in Barranquilla, Colombia since 2011. The event is part of the ATP Challenger Tour and has been played on clay courts since 2011.

Past finals

Singles

Doubles

References

External links
 Official website

ATP Challenger Tour
Tennis tournaments in Colombia
Hard court tennis tournaments
Seguros Bolívar Open Barranquilla
2011 establishments in Colombia